ISO 20022 is an ISO standard for electronic data interchange between financial institutions. It describes a metadata repository containing descriptions of messages and business processes, and a maintenance process for the repository content.  The standard covers financial information transferred between financial institutions that includes payment transactions, securities trading and settlement information, credit and debit card transactions and other financial information.

The repository contains a huge amount of financial services metadata that has been shared and standardized across the industry. The metadata is stored in UML models with a special ISO 20022 UML Profile. Underlying all of this is the ISO 20022 metamodel - a model of the models. The UML profile is the metamodel transformed into UML. The metadata is transformed into the syntax of messages used in financial networks. The first syntax supported for messages was XML Schema.

ISO 20022 is widely used in financial services. Organizations participating in ISO 20022 include: SWIFT, ISO 20022 is the successor to ISO 15022; originally ISO 20022 was called ISO 15022 2nd Edition. ISO 15022 was the successor of ISO 7775.

Parts of the standard 
ISO 20022 Financial services – Universal financial industry message scheme.

Management of the standard 
 The Standard is issued by ISO Technical Committee 68 (TC68), which is responsible for Financial Services in ISO.
 The Standard is managed by Working Group 4 (WG4), a sub-group of TC68 whose charter is "the management of ISO 20022".
 The Standard defines a Repository Management Group (RMG) Composed of senior industry experts. It is the highest registration body.
 SEG Standard Evolution Group composed of industry experts in specific business domains of the financial industry
 SWIFT is the Registration Authority for ISO 20022. RA is the guardian of the ISO 20022 financial repository.

Adoption 
A 2015 report by the United States's Federal Reserve System classified Europe having "mature adopters" of ISO 20022; India, South Africa, Japan, Singapore, and Switzerland as having "growing adopters"; and Australia, Canada, the United Kingdom, and New Zealand as having "interested adopters". The report concluded that the Federal Reserve should push for ISO 20022 adoption within the United States financial system.

Australia's New Payments Platform, launched in February 2018, uses ISO 20022 messaging. 

The Reserve Bank of New Zealand plans to support ISO 20022 from November 2022 onward.

In July 2018, the Federal Reserve Board of Governors requested comments on the proposed adoption of the ISO 20022 message format in a migration beginning in 2020 and ending in 2023.

Nordic countries launched the P27 payment platform.

See also 
 ISO 4217
 ISO 10962
 ISO 8583
 Society for Worldwide Interbank Financial Telecommunication

References

External links
iso20022.org ISO/TC68/20022/RMG - Registration Management Group:  Schema, newsletters, publications, extent of global adoption, presentations

20022
Market data
Financial metadata
Financial regulation
Financial routing standards